This is a list of notable Hindi thriller shows.

See also
 List of Hindi horror shows
 List of Hindi comedy shows
 List of Hindi thriller films 

Hindi television content related lists